Temple Hill is an unincorporated community in Jones County, Iowa, United States. Temple Hill is located on Iowa Highway 136, south of Cascade and north of Onslow.

Education
Residents are zoned to the Western Dubuque Community School District. They are assigned to Cascade Elementary School and Cascade Junior/Senior High School, both in Cascade.

References

Unincorporated communities in Jones County, Iowa
Unincorporated communities in Iowa